Adrian Shawn Bryson (born November 30, 1976) is a former American football running back. He played college football at the University of Tennessee.

College career

Bryson played at the University of Tennessee under head coach Phillip Fulmer from 1995-1998. Bryson would contribute all four seasons as a running back and was a threat in the receiving game considerably in his junior and senior seasons. Bryson was a team captain on the 1998 National Championship team. In the National Championship, which was the Fiesta Bowl, Bryson had three rushes for seven yards and three receptions for 34 yards in the 23-16 victory over the Florida State Seminoles. With the Volunteers, Bryson rushed for 505 career yards and eight touchdowns. In addition, he recorded 50 receptions for 484 yards and one receiving touchdown.

Professional career

After his collegiate career at the University of Tennessee, Bryson was drafted by the Buffalo Bills in the third round with the 86th overall pick of the 1999 NFL Draft. He led the Bills in rushing in 2000 with 591 yards. In addition to his time with the Bills, he played for the Detroit Lions for four seasons. After the 2006 season, Bryson did not play with another NFL team.

NFL career statistics

Coaching career
In 2012, Bryson was the fullbacks coach at Lenoir-Rhyne University. He was a graduate assistant at Temple University in 2013 and the running backs coach at Florida A&M in 2014. Bryson was the running backs coach at UT Chattanooga from 2015-2017. In 2017, Bryson was hired as the second head coach in the short history of the Rabun Gap-Nacoochee School Eagles football program.

References

1976 births
Living people
American football running backs
Tennessee Volunteers football players
Buffalo Bills players
Detroit Lions players
People from Franklin, North Carolina